Upper Makefield Township is a township in Bucks County, Pennsylvania, United States. The population was 8,190 at the 2010 census. It has the eighth highest per capita income among Pennsylvania townships. Its multimillion-dollar homes, top-notch public schools and easy commute to New York City, Princeton and Philadelphia led to its ranking as Best Place to Live in the Suburbs in Philadelphia Magazine's Best Places to Live list. Additionally, it has been listed as the Philadelphia area's second-most expensive suburb  and the 287th richest neighborhood in the United States, with a mean household income of $306,081.  The area has also been listed an alternative to the Hamptons for the summer by New York Magazine.

History
George Washington and the Continental Army crossed the Delaware River here the night of December 25–26, 1776, during the American Revolutionary War, leading to the victory at the Battle of Trenton on the morning of December 26.

The Brownsburg Village Historic District, Buckmanville Historic District, John Burroughs Homestead, Dolington Village Historic District, John Chapman House, Eagle Tavern, Hayhurst Farm, Keith House-Washington's Headquarters, Makefield Meeting and Smith Family Farmstead are listed on the National Register of Historic Places.

Geography
According to the United States Census Bureau, the township has a total area of 21.5 square miles (55.8 km), of which 20.9 square miles (54.2 km2)  is land and 0.6 square mile (1.6 km)  (2.88%) is water.

Past and present place names in Upper Makefield include Buckmanville, Dolington, Jericho, Lizette, Lurgan, Washington Crossing, and Woodhill.

Natural features include Houghs Creek, Jericho Mountain, and Pidcock Creek.

Demographics

As of the 2010 census, the township was 93.0% Non-Hispanic White, 1.1% Black or African American, 0.2% Native American, 2.5% Asian, and 1.0% were two or more races. 2.3% of the population were of Hispanic or Latino ancestry.

As of the census of 2000, there were 7,180 people, 2,512 households, and 2,105 families residing in the township. The population density was 343.1 people per square mile (132.5/km). There were 2,598 housing units at an average density of 124.1/sq mi (47.9/km). The racial makeup of the township was 97.12% White, 0.81% African American, 0.07% Native American, 1.27% Asian, 0.24% from other races, and 0.50% from two or more races. Hispanic or Latino of any race were 1.13% of the population.

There were 2,512 households, out of which 37.9% had children under the age of 18 living with them, 77.3% were married couples living together, 4.6% had a female householder with no husband present, and 16.2% were non-families. 12.3% of all households were made up of individuals, and 3.6% had someone living alone who was 65 years of age or older. The average household size was 2.86 and the average family size was 3.13.

In the township the population was spread out, with 26.7% under the age of 18, 5.1% from 18 to 24, 23.3% from 25 to 44, 34.7% from 45 to 64, and 10.2% who were 65 years of age or older. The median age was 42 years. For every 100 females, there were 96.7 males. For every 100 females age 18 and over, there were 99.6 males.

The median income for a household in the township was $102,759, and the median income for a family was $114,064. Males had a median income of $90,000 versus $42,365 for females. The per capita income for the township was $56,288. About 1.6% of families and 2.1% of the population were below the poverty line, including none of those under age 18 and 1.5% of those age 65 or over.

Climate

According to the Köppen climate classification system, Upper Makefield Township, Pennsylvania has a hot-summer, wet all year, humid continental climate (Dfa). Dfa climates are characterized by at least one month having an average mean temperature ≤ 32.0 °F (≤ 0.0 °C), at least four months with an average mean temperature ≥ 50.0 °F (≥ 10.0 °C), at least one month with an average mean temperature ≥ 71.6 °F (≥ 22.0 °C), and no significant precipitation difference between seasons. During the summer months, episodes of extreme heat and humidity can occur with heat index values ≥ 100 °F (≥ 38 °C). On average, the wettest month of the year is July which corresponds with the annual peak in thunderstorm activity. During the winter months, episodes of extreme cold and wind can occur with wind chill values < 0 °F (< -18 °C). The plant hardiness zone is 6b with an average annual extreme minimum air temperature of -0.2 °F (-17.9 °C). The average seasonal (Nov-Apr) snowfall total is between 24 and 30 inches (61 and 76 cm), and the average snowiest month is February which corresponds with the annual peak in nor'easter activity.

Transportation

Numbered highways serving Upper Makefield Township include Pennsylvania Route 32, Pennsylvania Route 232 and Pennsylvania Route 532. PA 32 follows River Road along a northwest-southeast alignment across the northeastern portion of the township, parallel to the Delaware River. PA 232 utilizes Windy Bush Road as it crosses the northwestern part of the township on a northeast-southwest alignment. Finally, PA 532 follows Washington Crossing Road on a southwest-northeast alignment across the southeastern portion of the township, reaching its northern terminus at PA 32 just shy of the Washington Crossing Bridge.

Ecology

According to the A. W. Kuchler U.S. potential natural vegetation types, Upper Makefield Township, Pennsylvania would have an Appalachian Oak (104) vegetation type with an Eastern Hardwood Forest (25) vegetation form.

References

External links

Upper Makefield Township
Upper Makefield Fire Company Home Page
Washington Crossing Historic Park
Friends of Washington Crossing Park

Townships in Bucks County, Pennsylvania
Townships in Pennsylvania
Pennsylvania populated places on the Delaware River